HMS Linnet was a 16-gun brig, built in 1814 by the Royal Navy at Ile aux Noix, Canada, as Niagara. Renamed Linnet and commanded by Commander Daniel Pring, RN, she served on Lake Champlain during the War of 1812. The Americans captured her in 1814 at the Battle of Lake Champlain at Plattsburgh, New York, and took her into service though she never sailed again. She was sold in 1825.

Service

Linnet joined Capt. George Downie's squadron, taking part in the Battle of Lake Champlain on 11 September 1814. Sailing down the bay, Linnet engaged the American brig , of 18 guns. Linnet did much damage to Eagle until Commodore Thomas Macdonough's flagship  raked Linnet, causing her to strike. Linnet had sustained losses of 10 killed and 15 wounded.

Fate
The Americans repaired Linnet and took her into the U.S. Navy as the USS Linnet. However, because the War of 1812 was over by that time, they placed her in ordinary at Whitehall, New York. She was sold in 1825.

Citations and references
Citations

References

 

 Battle of Plattsburgh 

Brigs of the Royal Navy
War of 1812 ships of the United Kingdom
1814 ships
Ships built in Quebec
War of 1812 ships of Canada
War of 1812 ships of the United States